Rank comparison chart of officers for navies of Anglophone states.

Officers

Notes

References

Military ranks of Anglophone countries
Military comparisons